Vidya Jyothi Mohamed Hussain Rezvi Sheriff, FRCP (Lon), FRCPE (Edin), FRACP, FCCP, FSLCGP, FNASSL is a Sri Lankan academic, nephrologist and physician. He served as the director of the Postgraduate Institute of Medicine; senior professor of medicine; head of the Department of Clinical Medicine at the Faculty of Medicine, University of Colombo. He is currently serving as the Senior Professor of Medicine at General Sir John Kotelawala Defence University. He is also a consultant physician and nephrologist at National Hospital Sri Lanka. He is widely regarded as the Father of Nephrology or either hailed as Father of Modern Nephrology and Dialysis. He masterminded and pioneered kidney transplantation in Sri Lanka. He is also the founder and owner of Western Hospital.

Education
Sheriff began his formal education at Zahira College Colombo and later received a scholarship and moved to Royal College Colombo. He subsequently entered the Faculty of Medicine, University of Colombo where he obtained both Bachelor of Medicine, Bachelor of Surgery and later Doctor of Medicine. He is a Fellow of the Royal College of Physicians, London, Royal College of Physicians of Edinburgh and the Ceylon College of Physicians.

Career
After qualification, he was appointed as a lecturer in medicine in the Department of Medicine under Professor Kumaradasa Rajasuriya in 1973. He obtained MRCP after completing his postgraduate training in the UK and he returned to Sri Lanka. He went onto have one of the longest academic careers in Sri Lankan university system.

He and his collaborator AH Sheriffdeen set up the first transplant programme in the country in October 1985. It also turned out to be the first ever kidney transplant in Sri Lanka as it was successfully achieved with the assistance of Colombo University team which also included Geri Jayasekara. The successful kidney transplant was a moral booster for many Sri Lankans who previously had to travel all the way to India to undergo such treatment. He and Surendra Ramachandran pioneered the speciality of Nephrology in Sri Lanka. Nearly 1,000 transplants have been done under his supervision. He was appointed as Professor of Medicine in 1990 and eight years later he was promoted as senior professor in Medicine in 1998.

He is a member of the senior advisory board to SACTRC (South Asian Clinical Toxicology Research Collaboration) with Nimal Senanayake, Ravindra Fernando and Janaka de Silva. He founded the OxCol (University of Oxford Colombo link) for studies on snake bite and yellow oleander poisoning. He was president of the Sri Lanka Medical Association, Ceylon College of Physicians, Sri Lanka Association for Nephrology and Transplantation, SAARC Society of Nephrology, Urology and Transplant Surgery and the Founder President of the Hypertension Society in Sri Lanka in addition to being a founder of the Health Informatics Society in Sri Lanka   and a councillor of the International Society of Nephrology. He is an External Examiner for MRCP in UK & Chennai. He is the Ceylon College of Physician Coordinator for MRCP Examinations in Sri Lanka. He was appointed as the President of Sri Lanka Medical Association in 2009.

He has published widely in Nephrology, Transplantation, Snake Bite and Oleander Poisoning. 

He is also the founder chairman of Western Infirmary Hospital in Colombo, a center known for renal disease care, dialysis and transplantation. In 2011, he was rated as the top scientist from Sri Lanka according to the Web of Science database.

He retired from University of Colombo on September 30, 2014, after rendering 41 years of service. During his illustrious career, his research interests included snake bites, Toxicology, Nephrology, non communicable diseases, medical education and chronic kidney disease of unknown aetiology. Following his kidney transplant, he is set to undertake a major kidney transplant programme at the Kotelewala Defence University.

Honours and awards
He is an Honorary Fellow of the Royal Australasian College of Physicians, Honorary Fellow of the College of General Practitioners of Sri Lanka and a Fellow of the National Academy of Science of Sri Lanka.

The titular prestigious honour Vidya Jyothi was conferred upon him by the Government of Sri Lanka in 1993 in recognition of his contribution to Nephrology, Dialysis and Transplantation in Sri Lanka. He also received a Lion International Merit Award.

Controversy 
In 2019, Rezvi filed complaints with the Criminal Investigation Department over some baseless allegations which surfaced in social media which revealed that he treated Zahran Hashim who was the prime suspect behind the 2019 Sri Lanka Easter bombings.

Personal life 
In October 2022, he himself underwent a successful kidney transplant at Western Infirmary/Western Hospital. He is diagnosed with diabetes, hypertension and was deemed to be a very high risk patient prior to the kidney transplantation.

References

External links 
 

Sri Lankan nephrologists
Sri Lankan academic administrators
Alumni of Zahira College, Colombo
Alumni of Royal College, Colombo
Alumni of the University of Colombo
Living people
Fellows of the Royal College of Physicians
Health informaticians
Vidya Jyothi
Academic staff of the University of Colombo
Year of birth missing (living people)
Fellows of the Royal College of Physicians of Edinburgh